Myotomy is a surgical procedure in which muscle is cut. A common example of a myotomy is the Heller myotomy.

See also 
 List of surgeries by type

References 

Surgical procedures and techniques